Alexis Sévennec-Verdier (born April 8, 1987) from La Tour-du-Pin is a French ski mountaineer and skyrunner.

Selected results 
 2011:
 6th, World Championship, team, together with Nicolas Bonnet
 2012:
 2nd, European Championship relay, together with Valentin Favre, Yannick Buffet and William Bon Mardion
 5th, European Championship, individual
 1st, Patrouille de la Maya, together with Valentin Favre and Kílian Jornet Burgada

Pierra Menta 

 2011: 10th, together with Xavier Gachet
 2012: 4th, together with Valentin Favre

Trofeo Mezzalama 

 2011, 6th, together with Grégory Gachet and Xavier Gachet

His running results include first place in the Mamores VK and second place in the Ring of Steall Skyrace in 2016.

References 

1987 births
Living people
French male ski mountaineers
French sky runners
20th-century French people
21st-century French people